James Neal Jeffrey Jr. (born July 23, 1953) is a former American football quarterback. He played for the San Diego Chargers in 1976.

References

1953 births
Living people
American football quarterbacks
Baylor Bears football players
San Diego Chargers players